Galina Arapova (born 16 June 1972) is a Russian jurist, director and senior media lawyer of the Mass Media Defence Centre in Voronezh. She is an expert on Russian media law.

Education 
Galina Arapova studied law at Voronezh State University. She has a law degree and post-graduate degree in world economy and international relations, graduated from Institute of European Law (Birmingham, UK).

Career 
In 1995 she went to work at Glasnost Defense Foundation. Since that she's been working in the field of freedom of expression and freedom of information.

Since 1996 she is the director and senior media lawyer of the non-profit organization Mass Media Defence Centre in Voronezh, one of the oldest Russian specialized NGOs. In 2015 the organization become a "foreign agent".

Arapova is also the vice-chair of international Board of international human rights organization Article 19 and a member of EHRAC’s International Steering Committee.

She is a member of the International Media Lawyers Association and of the Voronezh City Public Chamber.

Galina Arapova is a Russian national expert on the admissibility of the Council of Europe’s HELP programme (Human Rights Education for Legal Professionals).

Awards 

 Special FOE protection award from Russian Union of Journalists in 2011.
Anna Politkovskaya prize “Camerton” in 2015.
Moscow Helsinki Group award for human rights in 2015.
IBA Human Rights Award in 2016.

References

External links 

 Galina Arapova's interview to the IBA about the Mass Media Defense Center's work.
 “Freedom of speech is about self-respect.” Why Galina Arapova has been defending the rights of journalists in Russia for a quarter of a century now // Glasnaya, 27 July, 2021

1972 births
Living people
Russian women lawyers
21st-century Russian lawyers
21st-century women lawyers
People listed in Russia as media foreign agents
Voronezh State University alumni